Dermot Earley Junior (born 7 July 1978) is a Gaelic footballer who played for the Sarsfields Newbridge club and at senior level for the Kildare county team. He is the son of former Roscommon footballer and former Kildare manager Dermot Earley, brother of Kildare footballer David Earley and nephew of Roscommon footballer Paul Earley.

Earley was a regular player for Kildare at midfield position for more than 15 years and his performances won him All Star Awards in 1998 and 2009. He reached the 1998 All-Ireland Senior Football Championship Final with Kildare, and won Leinster medals in 1998 and again in 2000 after the replay against neighbours Dublin.

He retired from inter-county football in 2013.

In January 2017, Earley was named as the new chief executive of the Gaelic Players Association, replacing Dessie Farrell who stepped down in December 2016.

Honours
Club
 Kildare Senior Football Championship (4): 1999, 2001, 2005, 2012
 Kildare Senior Football League Division 1 (2): 2007, 2012
 Kildare Minor Football Championship (1): 1996

Inter-county
 Leinster Senior Football Championship (2): 1998, 2000
 All Star (2): 1998, 2009

References

1978 births
Living people
Kildare inter-county Gaelic footballers
Sarsfields (Kildare) Gaelic footballers